Henryk Herszel Hochman (1879 or 1881 in Lublin – 1942 or 1943 in Baczków near Bochnia, dates vary) was a Polish Jewish sculptor from the Academy of Fine Arts in Kraków. He was a student of Paweł Rosen in Warsaw, Konstanty Laszczka while in Kraków (1900–1906), and Auguste Rodin in France.

Work

Hochman specialized in figurative art such as sculpted portraits, the heads, and busts. Hochman is known for his bas-relief bronze entitled "Kol Nidre" (1907) in the former Town Hall of Kazimierz. He worked with marble, bronze, terracotta and majolica. During the Holocaust Henryk Hochman was deported to Bochnia Ghetto and murdered. Many of his works were lost.

References

 Henryk Herszel Hochman, "Kol Nidre" (bas-relief, 1907) former Town Hall of Kazimierz
 Henryk Hochman, "Two girls", glazed ceramics, Auction House Rempex. Warsaw, 2005

19th-century births
1940s deaths
Polish civilians killed in World War II
Artists from Kraków
20th-century Polish sculptors
Polish male sculptors
20th-century male artists
Polish Jews who died in the Holocaust
People who died in ghettos in Nazi-occupied Europe
Polish people executed in Nazi concentration camps